Louis Gregory (born July 1978), also known as Uncle Louie, is an American talent manager, music producer, and actor. He is the CEO of ULM Group. He was the former president and co-founder of The Legends of Wrestling. He formerly worked for the United States Department of Homeland Security. Louis Gregory has appeared on the sitcom The Goldbergs and is a TV stuntman for telenovelas on NBC Telemundo. He is also the president of America's Front Line which is the largest challenge coin, pin, and patch company for first responders in America.

Early life

He was born in New York City and was adopted by James and Penny Gregory. James Gregory was in the United States Army as an Army paratrooper and in the United States Air Force as an air force technical instructor. Penny was an automotive controller. Gregory attended Hillside Avenue High School in Queens and Sachem High School in Ronkonkoma, New York.

He graduated from Southampton Long Island University, with a double major, English Literature and Fine Arts with a digital graphics focus and a minor in theater. Louis, his wife, and his 2 daughters reside in Florida.

In 2016, Uncle Louie worked for the United States Department of Homeland Security as director of the Miami/Tampa Field Offices Communications Management Operations.

Music producer
Uncle Louie has produced songs for Prince Markie Dee, Wyclef Jean, Nas, LL Cool J, Rev. Run, DMX, Eric B. of Eric B. & Rakim and Jennifer Lopez. Louis became a studio engineer in 1996 working under Prince Markie Dee. Prince Markie Dee and Eric B. of Eric B. and Rakim were his mentors, guiding him into the world of hip hop music production.

Art
Uncle Louie began working with pop artist Romero Britto in 2011 and continues to be close with the Brazilian-born artist. In 2014 Uncle Louie was honored as the subject of a Romero Britto portrait. Uncle Louie creates pop art-based challenge coins and has done so for Michael Strahan and high-profile clients.

Media
In 2010, Uncle Louie worked with blogger Jessica Gottlieb on a special project to custom build the perfect mom car. Uncle Louie has a syndicated column on HuffPost that covers a number of topics from entertainment to travel and the luxury lifestyle.

Television appearances

In 2018, Uncle Louie co-starred on the television show The Goldbergs as Uncle Louie, the uncle of Valley Erica on the 18th episode during the 5th season. In 2019, Uncle Louie became a recurring role on The Goldbergs, co-starring again, in season 6, episode 15. In 2021, Uncle Louie performed as a voiceover actor in Garbage Pail Kids.

Entertainment manager
In 2008, Uncle Louie began working in the professional wrestling world with Bill Goldberg. In 2008, Uncle Louie opened Uncle Louie Music Group and Uncle Louie Management, serving as president of both companies. The company offers promotional and collectible merchandise design and manufacturing under various companies as part of the Uncle Louie conglomerate. Some of Louis' first talent signings were Prince Markie Dee and Kool Rock-ski, of the Fat Boys. Recently, Louis worked with artist Eric B. to reunite him with his old partner Rakim of Eric B. & Rakim to celebrate the 30th anniversary of the album Paid in Full. He was the President of Legends of Wrestling, Uncle Louie promoted live wrestling events in the United States. In 2017, Uncle Louie client Bill Goldberg appeared on multiple episodes of ABC's The Goldbergs after Uncle Louie worked with the show's writer Adam F. Goldberg.

References

1978 births
Living people
People from Brookhaven, New York
Stony Brook University alumni
Record producers from New York (state)